is a former Japanese football player.

Club statistics

References

External links

J. League (#24)

1988 births
Living people
Association football people from Tokyo
Japanese footballers
J2 League players
Mito HollyHock players
Association football midfielders